Joseph Khoury (born 24 October 1919 in Bekassine, Lebanon; died 5 February 1992) was a former Archeparch of the Maronite Catholic Archeparchy of Tyre.

Life

Joseph Khoury was on December 20, 1942, ordained to the priesthood. On April 21, 1956, he was simultaneously appointed Titular bishop of Ptolemais in Phoenicia dei Maroniti, Patriarchal Vicar and Auxiliary bishop in the Maronite Patriarchate of Antioch. His confirmation by the Holy See occurred on 4 May 1956 and Khoury on 29 June 1956 was consecrated bishop by Maronite Patriarch of Antioch Paul Peter Meouchi and his co-consecrators were Pietro Dib, Eparch of Cairo and Anthony Peter Khoraish, Titular bishop of Tarsus dei Maroniti. His appointment as bishop of Tyre was announced on December 11, 1959. As eparchy Tyre was raised in 1965 to the rank to Archeparchy and Khoury was also chosen Archbishop.

During his tenure, he participated in the four sessions of the Second Vatican Council and acted as co-consecrator in the episcopal ordinations of Chucrallah Harb, Eparch of Baalbek (Lebanon), Joseph Salamé, Archeparch of Aleppo (Syria) and Curiacos Moussess, Chaldean Catholic Bishop of Amadiya (Iraq).

Khoury died on February 5, 1992, at the age of 72.

See also
Maronite church

References

External links
 http://www.catholic-hierarchy.org/bishop/bkhouryj.html
 http://www.gcatholic.org/dioceses/diocese/tyrz1.htm

1919 births
1992 deaths
Lebanese clergy
20th-century Maronite Catholic bishops